Arme Millionäre (German: Poor Millionaires) is an Austro-German comedy-drama television film series, first aired on RTL on 22 August 2005. 12 episodes were aired between then and 2006. The series is about a billionaire family who suddenly find themselves poor.

See also 
 List of German television series

References

External links 
 

German comedy-drama television series
2005 German television series debuts
2006 German television series endings
RTL (German TV channel) original programming
Austrian television series
ORF (broadcaster)
2005 Austrian television series debuts
2006 Austrian television series endings
2000s Austrian television series
German-language television shows